Kim Tae-seong (born August 4, 1979) is a South Korean film and television composer. His credits include the films Crossing (2008), War of the Arrows (2011), The Admiral: Roaring Currents (2014), 1987: When the Day Comes (2017), Extreme Job (2019),  Space Sweepers (2021), The Roundup (2022) and the television series Emergency Couple (2014), Squad 38 (2016), Bad Guys 2 (2017), The Guest (2018) and My Liberation Notes (2022).

Filmography

It Was Raining (2002; short film)
The Girl With Red Shoes (2003; short film)
My Daddy (2003; short film)
Au Revoir, UFO (2004)
Her Earring (2004; featurette)
A Grand Day Out (2004; featurette)
The Red Shoes (2005) - music department staff
Duelist (2005) - music department staff
Goodbye (2005; featurette)
Waiting for Youngjae (2005; short film)
HD209458b (2005; featurette)
Slowly (2005; short film)
Bee Season (2005) - music department staff
Haan (2005) - music department staff
One Shining Day (2006)
A Millionaire's First Love (2006)
No Sympathy (2006; short film)
Monologue #1 (2006; short film)
Screw-driver (2006; short film)
Son's (2006; short film)
Enemy's Apple (2007; short film)
Their Familiar Date (2007; short film)
Lost (2007; short film)
Waiting (2007; short film)
Thank You (2007; short film)
A Tale of Legendary Libido (2008)
Crossing (2008)
The Accidental Gangster and the Mistaken Courtesan (2008)
Lovers (2008)
Trend Of This Fall (2008; short film)
Hey, Tom (2008; short film)
I Hope To Be Cloud! (2008; short film)
More than Blue (2009)
The Great Player (2009; short film)
The Newly Coming Seasons (2009; short film)
Bedevilled (2010)
Dart (2010; short film)
Eighteen (2010)
Cyrano Agency (2010)
Come, Closer (2010)
Officer of the Year (2011)
War of the Arrows (2011)
S.I.U. (2011)
Perfect Game (2011)
As One (2012)
The Grand Heist (2012)
Ghost Sweepers (2012)
Wonderful Radio (2012) - music department staff
The Tower (2012)
Cheer Up Mr. Lee (2012) - music department staff
She is Wow! (2013; TV series)
The Flu (2013)
Steel Cold Winter (2013)
Black Gospel (2013)
It's Time to Love (2013)
Han Gong-ju (2013)
Innocent Thing (2014)
Apostle (2014)
Bad Sister (2014)
A Midsummer's Fantasia (2014) - music department staff
The Admiral: Roaring Currents (2014)
Granny's Got Talent (2015)
Twenty (2015)
Office (2015)
The Priests (2015)
The Sound of a Flower (2015)
Hunting (2015; short film)
Mood of the Day (2016)
Phantom Detective (2016)
The Hunt (2016)
Familyhood (2016)
My Annoying Brother (2016)
The King's Case Note (2017)
Fabricated City (2017)
Steel Rain (2017)
1987: When the Day Comes (2017)
Need for Speed: Edge (2017; video game)
Be-Bop-A-Lula (2018)
Golden Slumber (2018)
What a Man Wants (2018)
Sovereign Default (2018)
Extreme Job (2019)
Svaha: The Sixth Finger (2019)
Idol (2019)
Space Sweepers (2021)
Miracle: Letters to the President (2021)
I Want to Know Your Parents (2022)
The Roundup (2022)

Television series

Awards and nominations

References

External links
 
 

1979 births
Living people
South Korean film score composers
Male film score composers
Male television composers